Kaij is a tehsil in Beed District, Maharashtra, India.

Cities and towns in Beed district